Canals is a deserted hamlet located in the municipality of Baix Pallars, in Province of Lleida province, Catalonia, Spain. As of 2020, it has a population of 2.

References

Populated places in the Province of Lleida